Beatrice may refer to:

 Beatrice (given name)

Places

In the United States
 Beatrice, Alabama, a town
 Beatrice, Humboldt County, California, a locality
 Beatrice, Georgia, an unincorporated community
 Beatrice, Indiana, an unincorporated community
 Beatrice, Nebraska, a city
 Beatrice, West Virginia, an unincorporated community

Elsewhere
 Beatrice, Queensland, a locality in the Tablelands Region, Queensland, Australia
 Beatrice, Zimbabwe, a village

Arts and entertainment 
 Beatrice (1919 film), an Italian historical film
 Beatrice (1987 film), a French-Italian historical drama
 Beatrice (radio programme), Sveriges Radio's 1989 Christmas calendar
 Beatrice (band), a Hungarian rock band
 "Beatrice", a song from Sam Rivers' time with Blue Note, on the 1964 album Fuchsia Swing Song
 Beatrice (singer), Béatrice Poulot (born 1968), French singer

Literature 
 Beatrice Portinari, principal inspiration for Dante Alighieri's Vita Nuova, and the Beatrice in his Divine Comedy
 Beatrice (novel), an 1890 novel by H. Rider Haggard

Other uses 
 Beatrice Foods, a former major American food processing company
 Beatrice Foods Canada
 Beatrice (psychedelic), a drug
 MSC Beatrice, a container ship
 Beatrice oil field in the Scottish sector of the North Sea
 Beatrice Wind Farm in the Scottish sector of the North Sea

See also 
 "Beatrijs", Dutch poem
 Beatrix